Prograde can refer to:

Retrograde and prograde motion, in astronomy, a type of motion of astronomical bodies
 Metamorphism#Prograde and retrograde, in geology, describes mineral changes in rocks under increasing pressure and/or temperature conditions
Progradation, in geography / geomorphology, refers to the growth of a river delta